Ritwik, Ritwick, Rithvik or Ritvik is a Hindu masculine given name from the Indian subcontinent. In Sanskrit, the word ṛtvik is the nominative case of the noun ṛtvij "seasonal sacrificer". The female form of the name is Ritwija, from Sanskrit ṛtvijā. The name may refer to the following notable people:

Ritvik Arora (born 1997), Indian television actor
Ritwik Bhattacharya (born 1979), Indian squash player
Ritwik Bhowmik, Indian web-series actor
Ritwick Chakraborty (born 1977), a Bengali film actor
Ritwik Das (born 1996), Indian football midfielder
Rithvik Dhanjani (born 1988), Indian television actor
Ritwik Ghatak (1925–1976), Indian Bengali filmmaker and script writer
Rithvik Raja (born 1989), Indian Carnatic musician
Ritwik Roy Chowdhury (born 1995), Indian cricketer
Ritwik Sanyal (born 1953), Indian classical singer

Other uses 

Indian masculine given names